Siddharth College may refer to:

 Siddharth College of Arts, Science and Commerce, in Mumbai, India
 Siddharth College of Law, Mumbai, in Mumbai
 Siddharth College of Commerce and Economics, a college in Mumbai